The First Holt Ministry (Liberal–Country Coalition) was the 41st ministry of the Government of Australia. It was led by the country's 17th Prime Minister, Harold Holt. The Second Holt ministry succeeded the Tenth Menzies ministry, which dissolved on 26 January 1966 following the retirement of former Prime Minister Sir Robert Menzies. The ministry was replaced by the Second Holt ministry on 14 December 1966 following the 1966 federal election.

As of 26 January 2023, Ian Sinclair is the last surviving member of the First Holt ministry; Sinclair is also the last surviving member of the Tenth Menzies ministry. James Forbes was the last surviving Liberal minister, and Allen Fairhall and Charles Barnes were the last surviving Liberal and Country Cabinet ministers respectively.

Cabinet

Outer ministry

Notes

Ministries of Elizabeth II
Holt, 1
1966 establishments in Australia
1966 disestablishments in Australia
Cabinets established in 1966
Cabinets disestablished in 1966